Ingrid Rüütel ( Ruus; born 3 November 1935) is an Estonian folklorist and philologist. From 2001 to 2006 she was the First Lady of Estonia, married to President Arnold Rüütel.

Personal life
Ingrid Rüütel was born in Tallinn as a daughter of communist politician Neeme Ruus and his wife actress Linda Karin Ruus ( Aruküll). Her father was killed by the German Army during World War II in 1942.

In 1958, Ingrid married Arnold Rüütel. They have two daughters and six grandchildren.

Honours 
 : Order of the Estonian Red Cross, Class III (1997)
 : Grand Cross of the Order of Merit of the Republic of Poland (2002)
 : Grand Cross of the Order of Vytautas the Great (30 September 2004)
 : Order of the White Star, Class I  (2008)

References

External links

 

1935 births
Living people
Estonian folklorists
Estonian ethnologists
Spouses of presidents of Estonia
Grand Crosses of the Order of Vytautas the Great
Estonian philologists
Women philologists
Women linguists
Women folklorists
Women ethnologists
Estonian women scientists
Recipients of the Order of the White Star, 1st Class
University of Tartu alumni